Alan Balfour (born 1939 in Edinburgh, Scotland) is the former dean of the Georgia Tech College of Architecture. He has also held research and/or faculty positions at MIT, Rice University, Architectural Association School of Architecture, and Rensselaer Polytechnic Institute, and was instrumental in establishing the master's degree program in architecture at Georgia Tech.

Biography
Balfour received a diploma in architecture from the Edinburgh College of Art in 1961, and was a Fulbright Scholar at Princeton University, where he received a Master of Fine Arts degree in architecture in 1965. In 1974 Balfour became a research associate and lecturer at MIT, a position he held until 1978, when he became a professor at Georgia Tech.

While at Georgia Tech Balfour was instrumental in establishing the master's degree program in architecture in 1980. He left Georgia Tech in 1988 and served as professor and dean of the Rice University School of Architecture from 1989–1991, as chairman of the Architectural Association School of Architecture from 1991–1995, and as professor and dean of the Rensselaer Polytechnic Institute School of Architecture from 1995–2008, before returning to Georgia Tech.  He was Dean of the College of Architecture from 2008 - 2013, and is now a professor.

Political positions
Architectural historian Denis R. McNamara called Balfour's "disdain for Christianity" in his 2012 book Solomon's Temple: Myth, Conflict, and Faith, "disturbing."  Balfour describes the replacement of pagan religions by Christianity as a process that “greatly diminished the richness of earthly, lived experience.”

Select bibliography 
Solomon's Temple: Myth, Conflict, and Faith 2012

Creating a Scottish Parliament, (with David McCrone) Finley Brown, Edinburgh, 2005.
Shanghai: World City, Academy Editions/J. Wiley and Son, New York, 2002
New York: World City, Academy Editions/J. Wiley and Son, New York, 2001
Berlin: World City, Academy Editions London, and Ernst & Sohn, Berlin, 1995.
Recovering Landscape edited with James Corner, Princeton Architectural Press, Princeton, 1999.
Contributions to Cities of Artificial Excavation: The Work of Peter Eisenman 1978-1988, CCA Montreal, Rizzoli International Publications, New York, 1994.
Contributions to The Edge of the Millennium Whitney Library of Design, New York, 1993.
Berlin: The Politics of Order, 1737- 1989, Rizzoli, New York, 1990. Winner of the AIA International Book Award, 1991.
Contributions to Contemporary Architects, St. Martins Press, New York, 1984, revised 1987.
Architectural Education Study, MIT, Boston, 1981, editor.
Rockefeller Center: Architecture as Theater, McGraw-Hill, New York, 1978.
Portsmouth, Studio Vista, London, 1970.
Contributions to Breakthrough to the Hudson, Ottinger Foundation, New York, 1964.

References

External links 
Alan Balfour web site
Administrator Page at the Georgia Tech College of Architecture
Georgia Tech College of Architecture web site

1939 births
Living people
Georgia Tech faculty
Alumni of the Edinburgh College of Art
Princeton University School of Architecture alumni
Massachusetts Institute of Technology faculty
Rice University faculty